1980–81 was a better season for Hibs. A good run in the First Division, with just six losses and victories of 5–0 against Dunfermline and 4–0 against Hamilton, led to promotion back to the top flight. The cup performances saw a fourth round exit against Ayr in the League cup and a fifth round defeat by Rangers in the Scottish cup

Scottish First Division

Final League table

Scottish League Cup

Scottish Cup

See also
List of Hibernian F.C. seasons

References

External links
Hibernian 1980/1981 results and fixtures, Soccerbase

Hibernian F.C. seasons
Hibernian